Fellows of the Royal Society elected in 1793.

Fellows

 Charles Abbot, 1st Baron Colchester (1757–1829)
 John Farr Abbott (1757–1794)
 Samuel Bosanquet (1768–1843
 Lord Frederick Campbell (1729–1816)
 John Day (1738–1808)
 Andrew Douglas (1736–1806)
 George Gostling (c.1745–1821)
 Richard Wilson Greatheed
 John Ingilby (1758–1815)
 Georg Christoph Lichtenberg (1742–1799)
 Joseph Mendoza y Rios (1762–1815)
 Hervey Redmond Morres, 2nd Viscount Mountmorres (c.1746–1797)
 Richard Richards (1752–1823)
 William Saunders (1743–1817)
 John Scott, 1st Earl of Eldon (1751–1838)
 William Scott, 1st Baron Stowell (1745–1836)
 Francis Stephens (c.1739–1807)
 Robert Stearne Tighe (1760–1835)
 William Charles Wells (1757–1817)
 William Hyde Wollaston (1766–1828)

Foreign members

 Johann Friedrich Blumenbach (1752–1840)

References

1793 in science
1793
1793 in Great Britain